Events from the year 1554 in France

Incumbents
 Monarch – Henry II

Events
 August 2 – Battle of Marciano: Senese–French forces are defeated by the Florentine–Imperial army.
 August 12 – Battle of Renty: French forces led by Francis, Duke of Guise turn back an invasion of Picardy by Charles V.

Births
 March 22 – Catherine de Parthenay, French noblewoman and mathematician (d. 1631)
 March 26 – Charles of Lorraine, Duke of Mayenne, French military leader (d. 1611)
 date unknown
 Jacques Bongars, French scholar and diplomat (d. 1612)

Deaths
 Anne de Laval, Viscountess of Thouars

See also

References

1550s in France